Andrzej Adam Kotkowski (17 February 1940 – 15 January 2016) was a Polish film director and screenwriter. He directed seventeen films between 1972 and 2009.

Selected filmography
 Olympics 40 (1980)
 Peaceful Years (1981)
 In the Old Manor, or the Independence of Triangles (1984)
 Citizen Piszczyk (1988)
 The attorney's team (1993)
 All the money in the world (1999)
 Women's Dressing Room (2001)
 Life Exam (2005)
 City from the Sea (2009)

References

External links

1940 births
2016 deaths
Polish film directors
Polish screenwriters
Film people from Lviv